The 1949 Maryland Terrapins football team represented the University of Maryland in 1949 college football season as a member of the Southern Conference (SoCon). Jim Tatum served as the head coach for the third season of his nine-year tenure. The team compiled a 9–1 record and received a bid to the 1950 Gator Bowl, where they defeated 20th-ranked Missouri, which was coached by Don Faurot, Tatum's former boss and the inventor of the split-T offense.

Schedule

Coaching staff
Jim Tatum, head coach
Al Woods
Jack Hennemier, line
Max Reed, line
Babe Wood, offensive asst.
John Cudmore
Warren Giese
Bill Meek, freshmen
Duke Wyre, trainer
W.W. Cobey, graduate manager

References

Maryland
Maryland Terrapins football seasons
Gator Bowl champion seasons
Maryland Terrapins football